Events from the year 1602 in Denmark.

Incumbents 

 Monarch – Christian IV

Events 
 The Danish–Icelandic Trade Monopoly is enacted.

Births 
 22 March – Iver Krabbe, nobleman and military officer (died 1666)
 7 December – Anne Holck, noblewoman (died 1660)

Deaths 
 21 February – Anne Oldeland, noblewoman
 8 April – Ludvig Munk, nobleman (born 1537)
 14 May – Niels Krag, academic and diplomat (born 1550)
 28 July – Peder Sørensen, physician (born c. 1542)
 28 October – John, Prince of Schleswig-Holstein, prince of Denmark (born 1583)

References 

 
Denmark
Years of the 17th century in Denmark